Jorge Horacio Brito (23 July 195220 November 2020) was an Argentine banker and businessman. He was the CEO of Argentina's largest bank, Banco Macro. He was also the president and chairman of the Argentine Banking Association (ADEBA) from 2003 to 2016.

His investments spanned real estate (through the firm Vizora), agriculture and livestock (through the companies Inversora Juramento, Frigoríficos Bermejo and Cabañas Juramento) and wind power (through Genneia Inc.)

In 2017, Forbes placed him at number 1,567 on The World's Billionaires list.  He was the seventh richest person in Argentina at this time.

Early life
Jorge Horacio Brito was born to an upper-class family in Buenos Aires in 1952. After the death of his father in 1962, he was raised by his mother.  Jorge Brito is the relative of Pedro Brito of Buenos Aires Argentina. Pedro Brito worked at the Buenos Aires Argentina Municipality. During the 1930s his three brother's were attorneys at law.  The Brito brothers ran a government election campaigne for one of their own Brito brother's campaigning running for mayor of the city of Buenos Aires Argentina.   The Brito brothers were assassinated during election democratic support of democracy on the streets of Buenos Aires Argentina.

Career

Banking and finance
He founded Anglia, a brokerage firm, in 1976 and in 1985, purchased a competing brokerage, Financiera Macro, forming Macro Bank (Banco Macro). His growth in the early years was fueled in part by his proximity to politicians in the northern provinces of Argentina, to whom he acted as a financial agent managing their treasury funds.  He was named chairman of the board of directors in June 1988 while Macro Bank grew steadily with the acquisition of numerous provincial banks privatised during the 1990s, including the Bank of Salta and of neighbouring Tucumán Province.

Macro Bank grew to become one of the major private banks of Argentina, with several branches across the country. Brito was the chairman of Macro Bank's board of directors, its chief executive officer, and a member of its executive committee and senior credit committee.

Brito became chairman of the Argentine Banking Association (ADEBA) on April 8, 2003, and held this position until 2016, when he was succeeded by Daniel Llambías, chairman of Grupo Financiero Galicia owner of Banco Galicia. In 2017, this position was taken by Brito's son Jorge Pablo Brito, who was also a director of Macro Bank.

ADEBA was founded in 1972 and is part of the G-6 Group, which unites the main Argentine business entities such as the Argentine Industrial Union, the Buenos Aires Stock Exchange, the Argentine Construction Chamber, the Argentine Chamber of Commerce, and the Argentine Rural Society. The Group organizes debates related to domestic economy and development.

Brito served as chairman of the boards of directors of Banco del Tucuman S.A., Inversora Juramento S.A., and Banco Privado de Inversiones S.A. He was the founder and CEO of Banco Macro, and oversaw investments in diverse activities such as real estate (through Vizora), and in farming and cattle raising through Inversora Juramento Inc., Frigoríficos Bermejo Inc. cold storages and Cabañas Juramento Inc. butcher shops. He owned a share of Genneia Inc., an energy sector company. He also served as chairman of the board of directors of YPF, long the largest petroleum producer and refiner in Argentina. Brito was among those who expressed interest in the purchase of 20% of the Madrid-based Repsol's ownership of the former state oil concern, when these shares were offered for sale in 2007.

Between 2012 and 2014, Jorge Horacio Brito was the president of the Latin America Banking Federation (FELABAN), a non-profit organization whose aim is to ease and promote relationships between all Latin American financing entities.

Real estate 
Brito invested in real estate through Vizora Developers; its core business is real estate development and marketing, and it has been actively engaged in the real estate development of the district of Puerto Madero, in Buenos Aires, where it had built Remeros Beach, Link Towers, Madero Walk, Madero Walk Eventos and Zen City. He has similarly invested in local luxury hotels, country clubs, and other upmarket real estate, including Central Tucumano (San Miguel de Tucumán), Arboris (Las Lomas and La Horqueta, at San Isidro), and the new and sustainable building of the Macro Bank at Catalinas Norte, Buenos Aires City.

Macro Bank participated in the construction of Madero Center, a luxury mixed use development building located in the neighbourhood of Puerto Madero in Buenos Aires.

Agriculture and livestock 
Brito's farming and cattle raising investments involved cattle breeding, meat industrialization, and agricultural commodities, mainly in soy. Inversora Juramento Inc. is in charge of cattle breeding. Frigoríficos Bermejo cold storage is engaged in industrial slaughtering and meat industrialization that reaches the consumer through Cabañas Juramento Inc. butcher shops, which operates stores and online delivery services.

Inversora Juramento Inc., founded in 1990, is one of the leading farming-cattle companies in the Argentine Northern Region. It is located in the town of Joaquín V. González, Salta, where it owns 67,000 hectares of field and 54,000 head of cattle. Its core activity is the manufacture and trading of beef. In addition, the company sows around 12,600 hectares per year. 8,000 hectares are soya fields. It also sows sorghum, alfalfa and corn, which are used to feed the cattle.

Frigoríficos Bermejo Inc. is a cold storage located in Pichanal, Salta. It owns a model industrial slaughtering and meat industrialization beef plant. The factory can monthly slaughter 10,000 head of cattle. Wholesale and retail sales of Frigoríficos Bermejo Inc. are carried out in Salta and Jujuy by their own butcher shops and sales teams. The company also exports to Chile and the European Union, which are markets that had approved their industrial processes.

In 2016, he won the Fortuna Lifetime Achievements Awards for his contributions to the Argentinian business community.

Personal life
Brito married Marcela Carballo and had six children. He and his pilot died in a helicopter accident in Cabra Corral, in the province of Salta, on November 20, 2020. He was 68.

References

External links
Jorge Horacio Brito

Argentine businesspeople
People from Buenos Aires
1952 births
2020 deaths
Argentine billionaires
Victims of aviation accidents or incidents in Argentina
Victims of aviation accidents or incidents in 2020